Ulvenhout is a village in the Dutch province of North Brabant. It is located in the municipality of Breda. The village was divided by the A58 motorway. The southern part belongs to the municipality of Alphen-Chaam and is called Ulvenhout AC.

History 
The village was first mentioned in 1274 as Ulvenholti. The -hout part means deciduous forest. Ulven is suspected to be an extinct word for species of tree. Ulvenhout was an agrarian settlement which started to developed in the 19th century along the Breda to Hoogstraten road.

The Roman Catholic St Lawrence Church was built between 1903 and 1904 in Gothic Revival style. The tall tower has a constricted spire with corner turrets. It forms a collection with the nearby clergy house and school. A 17th century gate post and house are near the church which belonged to the buitenplaats summer residence of Justinus van Nassau, the governor of Breda.

Ulvenhout was home to 266 people in 1840. In 1942, it became part of the municipality of Nieuw-Ginneken. In 1997, it was merged into Breda except for the part of the village south of the A58 which was transferred to the municipality of Alphen-Chaam.

Gallery

References

External links

Populated places in North Brabant
Alphen-Chaam
Breda